Betaha is a village in Sitamarhi district of Bihar, India. According to the 2020 census of India, it has a population of nearly 10,000 people. It is a Muslim-majority village.

References 

Villages in Sitamarhi district